The 2021 Chile Open (also known as the Chile Dove Men+Care Open for sponsorship reasons) was a men's tennis tournament played on outdoor clay courts. It was the 23rd edition of the Chile Open, and part of the ATP 250 of the 2021 ATP Tour. It took place in Santiago, Chile from 8 through 14 March 2021.

Champions

Singles 

  Cristian Garín def.  Facundo Bagnis, 6–4, 6–7(3–7), 7–5

Doubles 

  Simone Bolelli /  Máximo González def.  Federico Delbonis /  Jaume Munar, 7–6(7–4), 6–4

Singles main draw entrants

Seeds 

 Rankings are as of March 1, 2021.

Other entrants 
The following players received wildcards into the singles main draw:
  Juan Manuel Cerúndolo 
  Nicolás Jarry 
  Gonzalo Lama

The following player received special exemption into the singles main draw:
  Francisco Cerúndolo

The following players received entry from the qualifying draw:
  Sebastián Báez
  Holger Rune 
  Alejandro Tabilo
  Juan Pablo Varillas

Withdrawals
  Fabio Fognini → replaced by  Jaume Munar
  Miomir Kecmanović → replaced by  Andrej Martin
  Dominik Koepfer → replaced by  Daniel Elahi Galán
  Juan Ignacio Londero → replaced by  Facundo Bagnis
  Pedro Martínez → replaced by  Daniel Altmaier
  Thiago Monteiro → replaced by  Jozef Kovalík
  Guido Pella → replaced by  Pedro Sousa

Doubles main draw entrants

Seeds

1 Rankings are as of March 1, 2021

Other entrants
The following pairs received wildcards into the doubles main draw:
  Marcelo Tomás Barrios Vera /  Alejandro Tabilo 
  Nicolás Jarry /  Leonardo Mayer

Withdrawals 
Before the tournament
  Federico Delbonis /  Juan Ignacio Londero → replaced by  Federico Delbonis /  Jaume Munar

References

External links 
 

Chile Open
Chile Open (tennis)
Chile Open
Chile Open